This is a list of comic book superheroes that originate from Russia or the former Soviet Union.

BUBBLE Comics
BUBBLE Comics is the largest Russian comic book publisher and produces monthly non-franchised comic books.

 Danila the Demonslayer (Данила-бесобой), is a grim avenger who exterminates demons with the power of living tattoos made from Satan's blood.
 Major Grom (Майор Гром), whose real name is Igor Grom, is a skilled detective from St. Petersburg known for his daring nature and uncompromising attitude towards criminals of all kinds.
 Friar (Инок), Friar, a.k.a. Andrey Radov, is an heir to the ancient generation and the owner of a powerful artifact – a cross inlaid with Power Gems.
 Red Fury (Красная Фурия), is the best thief in the world, recruited by agent Delta from the International Control Agency.
 Meteora (Метеора), is a nickname of legendary space smuggler Alena Kuznetsova.
 Lilia Romanova (Лилия Романова), is an ordinary Moscow teenager who unveils the secrets of the mysterious Book Wizard Order whose members have been trying to hold the balance between book worlds and reality.

DC Comics
 Anatole (Former member of Red Trinity, ally of The Flash, and runs Kapitalist Kouriers in the US)
 Bebeck (Former member of Red Trinity, ally of The Flash, and employee of Kapitalist Kouriers)
 Bolshoi (super speed  and agility, Martial artist and dancer, and Former member of the People's Heroes)
 Cassiopea (Former member of Red Trinity, ally of The Flash, and employee of Kapitalist Kouriers)
 Cossack (One of the Batmen of Many Nations from Kingdom Come)
 Creote (An ally of the Birds of Prey)
 Fireball (Sonya Chuikov, member of the Young Allies)
 Firebird (Serafina Arkadina, telepath and leader of Soyuz, a group of teen heroes, niece of Pozhar)
 Fusion (Three men known only as One, Two and Three could combine their bodies into a single superior form, from The Outsiders vol. 1 #23-24)
 Hammer (Super strong metahuman, member of the People's Heroes, and husband of Sickle)
 KGBeast (Anatoli Knyazev, an assassin)
 Molotov (Explosives expert and explosive metahuman, potentially other worldly, and member of the People's Heroes)
 Morozko (Igor Medviedenko, cryokinetic member of Soyuz)
 Perun (lya Trepilov, electrokinetic member of Soyuz)
 Pozhar (Russian hero who was once bonded to Firestorm and former Rocket Red recruited by the Red Shadows)
 Pravda (powerful telepathic with a variety of mental abilities and member of the Peoples Heroes)
 Proletariat (Boris Mikhail Dhomov, a Soviet supersoldier created during World War II. Flash vol.2 #51)
 Red Star (Leonid Konstantinovitch Kovar, former member and current ally of the Teen Titans)
 Red Son Superman, a Russian Superman raised as a Stalinist
 Rocket Red Brigade (dedicated to the protection of the Russian Federation)
 Rusalka (Mashenka Medviedenko, hydrokinetic member of Soyuz)
 Anya Savenlovich (former Green Lantern)
 Sickle (Super strong metahuman, member of the People's Heroes wife of Hammer)
 Snow Owl (Former KGB operative who joined the Hellenders, able to generate intense cold)
 Stalnoivolk (Super strength, damage reduction, leaping, and Member of the Red Shadows)
 Tundra (Strong and able to generate a pulse wave of intense cold - Member of the Global Guardians)
 Valentina Vostok (Formerly Negative Woman of the Doom Patrol)
 Vikhor (Feodor Piotrovich Sorin, member of Soyuz. He can spin while reducing his gravity, creating a whirlwind to float in)

Wildstorm (ABC/Homage)

 Void (Adrianna Tereshkova of WildC.A.T.S.)
 Void (Nikola Hanssen of WildC.A.T.S.)
 Winter (Nikolas Andreyvitch Kamarov, a member of Stormwatch)

Marvel Comics
 Abomination (Emil Blonsky), human mutate, AKA: Agent R-7, The Ravager of Worlds Abomination (comics)
 Airstrike (Dmitri Bukharin, Member of the People's Protectorate)
 Anole (Victor Borkowski)
 Black Widow (Natasha Romanoff of the Avengers)
 Black Widow (Yelena Belova, current team leader of the Thunderbolts)
 Blind Faith (Alexi Garnoff, leader of the Russian Exiles and underground group of Mutants. He created the Underground Mutant Safe System and lost his powers during the Decimation.)
 Bora (A mutant who could create intense cold. She lost her powers after M-Day)
 Colossus (Peter Rasputin of the X-Men)
 Concussion (Mikhail, a mutant from the Russian Exiles, deceased)
 Crimson Dynamo (Professor Anton Vanko, deceased)
 Crimson Dynamo (Boris Turgenov, deceased)
 Crimson Dynamo (Alexander Nevsky, deceased)
 Crimson Dynamo (Yuri Petrovich, exiled to Siberia)
 Crimson Dynamo (Dmitri Bukharin, now known as Airstrike)
 Crimson Dynamo (Colonel-General Valentin Shatalov, worked for the Red Skull)
 Crimson Dynamo (unknown)
 Crimson Dynamo (Gennady Gavrilov, possibly retired)
 Crimson Dynamo (unknown)
 Darkstar (Member of the Winter Guard; former member of the Soviet Super-Soldiers)
 Doctor Volkh (Vladimir Orekhov, stretching powers, leader of the Russian Fantastic Four known as the Bogatyri)
 Epsilon Red (Ivanov,  a Russian Super-Soldier, is a genetically-engineered cosmonaut with psychic abilities. He restored Wolverine's memories.)
 Fantasma (Member of the People's Protectorate)
 Gregor Smerdyakov (a mutant who becomes a sentient tree)
 Gremlin (Kondrati Topolov, formerly of the Soviet Super-Soldiers, deceased)
 Iron Curtain (Simas, a mutant from the Russian Exiles, deceased)
 It, the Living Colossus (Created by a Russian sculptor named Boris Petrovski)
 Katyusha (One of the First Line, deceased)
 Kraven the Hunter (real name: Sergei Kravinoff. He is a Russian immigrant to the U.S.)
 Illyana Rasputin (Magik, member of New Mutants and ruler of Limbo)
 Mentac (Mutant from the Russian Exiles, possessed a fifth-level brain capable of computer-like analysis, deceased)
 Mikhail Nikolaievitch Rasputin (A mutant who was the older brother of Colossus of the X-Men and Magik of the New Mutants. He was a former Russian cosmonaut, a superhero, a supervillain, and a presumed messiah. He is deceased.)
 Mikula (Mikula Golubev, Mutant telepath and telekinetic, member of the Bogatyri)
 Mind singer (one of the Young Gods)
 Morning Star (Marya Meshkov, flight and heat powers, former member of the Bogatyri)
 Omega Red
 Perun (Member of the People's Protectorate)
 Presence (A Russian nuclear physicist)
 Red Ghost
 Red Guardian (Aleksey Lebedev, WWII hero)
 Red Guardian (Alexei Alanovich Shostakov, former husband of Natasha Romanoff the Black Widow. Faked his own death.)
 Red Guardian (Dr. Tania Belinsky, now mutated into the being known as Starlight)
 Red Guardian (Josef Petkus, now calls himself Steel Guardian as a member of the Winter Guard)
 Red Guardian (Krassno Granitsky, ally of Maverick)
 Red Guardian (Anton, deceased)
Rhino (Aleksei Mikhailovich Sytsevich, Spiderman Villain, Member of the Sinister Six) 
 Sibercat (Member the Winter Guard, formerly of the Russian Exiles)
 Sputnik (Member of the People's Protectorate)
 Stencil (A mutant from the Russian Exiles)
 Starlight
 Steel Guardian (Josef Petkus, member of the Winter Guard)
 Svyatogor (Sasha Pokryshkin, superhuman strength, member of the Bogatyri)
 Synthesizer (Zoya Vasilievna and Arkady Tegai are two Mutates who merge to become Synthesizer.)
 Titanium Man (Boris Bullski)
 The Russian
 Ursa Major (Member of the Winter Guard, formerly with Soviet Super-Soldiers)
 Vanguard (Member of the Winter Guard, brother of Darkstar)
 Wasp (Nadia van Dyne)
 Whiplash (Anton Vanko)

Epic
 Molniya ("Lightning" from Wild Cards)

New Universe
 Stacey Inyushin (A member of Psi-Force with healing powers)
 Crasniye Solleetsi (Red Sun), a team of Russian paranormals.

Other publishers

Fleetway / Rebellion
 Nikolai Dante (Thief and adventurer, bonded with a techno-organic device called a Weapons Crest.)

Harvey
 Tanya (A member of War Nurse's Girl Commandos)

Image
 Animus Prime (Bar Sinister)
 Maya Antares (sorceress from world of the Red Star)
 Red Rush (short-lived Flash analogue in the pages of Invincible)

Love and Rockets
 Comrade 7 (A heroine with a fan club)

UNForce
Mother Russia (UNForce)
Mercury Comics
 Atomika Russian atomic superman

Public Domain
 Octobriana (from the comic "Octobriana and the Russian Underground")
 Gritsko Sraka (from the comic "The last Molfar")

Film and television
 Black Lightning (Dmitry Maykov), from the eponymous 2009 Russian film.
 Ilioukhine (Seigi Choujin from Russia, Kinnikuman Nisei)
 Linka (Planeteer from Russia, Captain Planet)
 Supercat (comics, J. Kaczyński)
 Red Star (Teen Titans TV)
 Rocket Red (Justice League Unlimited)
 Molotov Cocktease (The Venture Bros.)
 The Warsman (Seigi Choujin from Russia, Kinnikuman)
 Guardians (2017 film)
 Cosmoball (2020 film)
 Major Grom: Plague Doctor (2021), a superhero film about a police major named Igor Grom, based on the comic strip Major Grom.

External links
 Marvel Universe Appendix
 International Catalog of Superheroes
 The Religious Affiliation of Comic Book Characters
 Internationalhero (Superheroes from around the world)
 Jorge's Superlists
 DCU Guide
 Psi-Force Remembered
 Popthought Bar Sinister
 Speed Comics #20: War Nurse
 Nikolai Dante Homepage
 Nikolai Dante at International Hero
 Love and Rockets Index: C
 Cosmic Teams: The Peoples Heroes
 Artful Salamander Portal
 Marvel Universe: People's Protectorate
 Marvel Universe Appendix: Bogatyri
 Cosmic Teams: Soyuz
 Marvel Universe Appendix: Exiles
 Marvel Universe Appendix: Underground Mutant Safe System
 Marvel Universe Appendix: Blind Faith
 Marvel Universe Appendix: Synthesizer
 Firestorm 2 HQ: Pozhar

Lists of fictional characters by nationality
Lists of superheroes
 
Superheroes